North Dawson was a territorial electoral district in the Canadian territory of Yukon, which returned one or two members to the Yukon Territorial Council from 1905 to 1920.

Members

References

Former Yukon territorial electoral districts